Sanid al-Sharqi is a sub-district located in Al Udayn District, Ibb Governorate, Yemen. Sanid al-Sharqi had a population of 6169 as of 2004.

References 

Sub-districts in Al Udayn District